is a train station on the Nankō Port Town Line (New Tram) in Suminoe-ku, Osaka, Japan. The station is assigned the station number P14. In 2013 Ferry Terminal Station was the least used station in the Osaka Metro's network with only 3,472 daily passengers.

The station is connected to the Osaka Nankō Ferry Terminal of the Osaka Port by an elevated pedestrian walkway.

The station opened on March 16, 1981.

Layout
There are an island platform and 2 tracks elevated.

References

Railway stations in Osaka Prefecture
Osaka Metro stations
Railway stations in Japan opened in 1981